is a 1968 Japanese horror film directed by Noriaki Yuasa. The film is about a young girl named Sayuri who is reunited with her estranged family after years in an orphanage, but discovers that her homelife involves an amnesiac mother, her sister is confined to the attic and begins to wonder if this is related to her father's experiments with poisonous snakes.

Cast

Release
The Snake Girl and the Silver-Haired Witch was released in Japan on December 14, 1968. It was released in the United States by Daiei International Films with English subtitles in 1969. The film was released on Blu-ray by Arrow Video in September 2021. This was its blu-ray debut and the first time it was released on home video outside of Japan.

Reception
From retrospective reviews, Andrew Crump of Fangoria found that the film on paper seemed like "Japanese genre cinema at its wackiest" but was more like a Scooby-Doo mystery and was "shockingly middle of the road verging on tame" and concluded that the film was "a movie of bungled opportunity with plenty to say about the era it was made."

References

Sources

External links
 

1968 horror films
Japanese horror films
Daiei Film films
Kazuo Umezu
Live-action films based on manga
1960s Japanese films